Balbir Singh Sidhu is the Incumbent member of Punjab Legislative Assembly and was Cabinet Minister of Health and Family Welfare and Labour in Punjab Government.

Career
He joined the Indian National Congress in the '90s and served as Joint Secretary, Vice president, and Senior Vice president of the Punjab Youth Congress Committee. He was also appointed in charge of Congress during Lok Sabha election 1999 in Punjab.

In 2007 Punjab assembly election he won from Kharar Assembly constituency by defeating Shiromani Akali Dal candidate Jasjit Singh. Again won from S. A. S. Nagar Assembly constituency in 2012 and then in 2017 elections.

He joined Bhartiya Janta Party on 4 June 2022 along with Raj Kumar Verka, Gurpreet Singh Kangar, Sundar Sham Arora, and others at the party office in Chandigarh.

References

1959 births
Living people
21st-century Indian politicians
Politicians from Barnala district
Punjab, India MLAs 2007–2012
Former members of Indian National Congress from Punjab
Punjab, India MLAs 2012–2017
Punjab, India MLAs 2017–2022
Bharatiya Janata Party politicians from Punjab